Judith Grace Pordon (born 1954) is an American poet, writer, and poetry editor. The central themes in her poetry are: the multicultural experience, celebration of various types of love, and contemporary social issues. Some of her more well known works include, How Will You Kiss?, Expiration, and  At The Top Of The Food Chain But The Bottom Of The Line.

Life 
Judith Grace Pordon was born in Atlanta, Georgia. Her mother, Eleanor Haggett Pordon, left an administrative and scientific career in chemistry to raise her children and was Judith's principal muse.

At age five, her family moved from Georgia to suburban Boston. Her high school education was completed in Concord, Massachusetts, a few blocks from Thoreau's Walden Pond. She graduated from New College of California in 1978.

Poetry 
Her early poems, in the 1970s and 1980s, explored various themes including contact with nature,
and social criticism. In the 1990s, she lived in Hawaii and a multicultural emphasis appeared in her work. She was befriended and mentored by Aemilia Laracuen, artist and primary muse of poet Robert Graves, who encouraged her to seek publication.

After writing poetry for 30 years, she began submitting her work to literary journals. In her first year her work was published in over two dozen journals, including Chiron Review, Tulane Review, Writers Journal, Buffalo Bones, The Rockford Review, The Ledge, The Orange Willow Review, VLQ, Black Bear Review, and The American Dissident.

Poetry anthologies such as Many Mountains Moving (on Spirituality), Comrades Anthology, The Austin International Poetry Festival Anthology (both in 1999 and in 2001) and Uno have published her poems.

She has also been published in dozens of poetry e-zines including The 2River View, Agnieska's Dowry, Stirring, Poetry Super Highway, Poetic Voices, Recursive Angel, ZeroZine, Facets Magazine, Southern Ocean Review, and Verse Libre.

Her first screenplay, sHe, was completed in 1993. Her first book of poems, The Body Speaks, was completed in 1999, and her second, The Long Way Home, was published in  2002.

Future works, currently in progress, include a book on creativity, several more books of poetry, an autobiography, and an amplification of her screenplay sHe into a novel.

Commissions and recognition 
In 2001, she was commissioned by Andrew Levin of Clemson University Music Department to write lyrics for an operatic composition, Flourishing True which was performed in the winter of 2002 at the 10th anniversary of the Brooks Center at Clemson University.

She is listed in The Who's Who of American Women, and The Who's Who of the World.

Poetry editor 
Since 2001, she has been the editor of an [online international poetry anthology] is a widely read website on anti-war poems, nature poetry, poems of loss and grieving, spiritual poetry, women poets, and poems in Spanish. She has helped popularize many contemporary poets including David Shumate, Lola Haskins, Quentin Huff, Susan Dane, Bill Mohr, Scott Wiggerman, Gaston Ng, and Marilyn Krysl.

References

1954 births
Living people
20th-century American poets
American women poets
American online publication editors
Bisexual women
20th-century American women
21st-century American women